Jill M. Hruby is an American mechanical engineer and government official. Since July 26, 2021, Hruby has served as Under Secretary of Energy for Nuclear Security and Administrator of the National Nuclear Security Administration, a post subject to Senate confirmation. Jill Hruby made history as the first woman to ever head a U.S. nuclear weapons lab, serving as director of Sandia National Laboratories from 2015-2017.

Early life and education 

Jill M. Hruby was born in 1959 in Defiance, Ohio. She is a native of Ann Arbor, Michigan. Hruby earned her bachelor’s degree from Purdue University College of Engineering and her master’s degree from the UC Berkeley College of Engineering, both in mechanical engineering.

Career 

Hruby joined Sandia National Laboratories as a member of the technical staff in 1983 and retired as the director in 2017. At Sandia, Hruby held roles of increasing management responsibilities with experiences in nuclear weapons systems and component design, nuclear non-proliferation, defense and homeland security technologies and systems, renewable energy, materials science, engineering sciences, and microsystems technology. She was the first woman to lead a national security lab. Since her retirement, she served as the inaugural Sam Nunn Distinguished Fellow at the Nuclear Threat Initiative from 2018 to 2019.

On April 14, 2021, President Joe Biden nominated Hruby to be the Under Secretary of Energy for Nuclear Security and Administrator of the National Nuclear Security Administration. The nomination has been endorsed by Secretary of Energy Jennifer Granholm. On April 22, 2021, her nomination was sent to the Senate. On June 16, 2021, a hearing on her nomination was held before the Senate Armed Services Committee. On June 10, 2021, her nomination was reported out of committee. On July 22, 2021, her nomination was confirmed by a vote of 79–16. She was sworn in on July 26, 2021.

Professional memberships and awards 

Hruby has been a member of the Defense Science Board, the National Nuclear Security Administration Defense Programs Advisory Committee, and the National Academy of Science Committee for International Security and Arms Control.

In 2016, she received the Suzanne Jenniches Upward Mobility Award from the Society of Women Engineers. In 2017, Business Insider named her the second most powerful female engineer. She has received the Department of Energy Secretary’s Exceptional Service Award, the National Nuclear Security Administrator’s Distinguished Service Gold Award, and Office of the Secretary of Defense Medal for Exceptional Public Service.

On May 13, 2022, Hruby was awarded an honorary doctorate of engineering by her undergraduate alma mater, Purdue University.

Hruby was elected to the National Academy of Engineering in 2022.

References 

Place of birth missing (living people)
Year of birth missing (living people)
Living people
21st-century American engineers
21st-century American women
American mechanical engineers
American women engineers
Biden administration personnel
Purdue University College of Engineering alumni
UC Berkeley College of Engineering alumni
United States Department of Energy officials